Ethanolamine (2-aminoethanol, monoethanolamine, ETA, or MEA) is an organic chemical compound with the formula  or . The molecule is bifunctional, containing both a primary amine and a primary alcohol. Ethanolamine is a colorless, viscous liquid with an odor reminiscent of ammonia. ETA molecules are a component in the formation of cellular membranes and are thus a molecular building block for life. It was thought to exist only on Earth and on certain asteroids, but in 2021 evidence was found that ETA molecules exist in interstellar space. 

Derivatives of ethanolamine are widespread in nature; e.g., lipids, as precursor of a variety of N-acylethanolamines (NAEs), that modulate several animal and plant physiological processes such as seed germination, plant–pathogen interactions, chloroplast development and flowering, as well as precursor, combined with arachidonic acid  20:4, ω-6), to form the endocannabinoid anandamide (20:4, ω-6).

The ethanolamines comprise a group of amino alcohols. A class of antihistamines is identified as ethanolamines, which includes carbinoxamine, clemastine, dimenhydrinate, chlorphenoxamine, diphenhydramine and doxylamine.

Industrial production
Monoethanolamine is produced by treating ethylene oxide with aqueous ammonia; the reaction also produces diethanolamine and triethanolamine. The ratio of the products can be controlled by the stoichiometry of the reactants.

Biochemistry
Ethanolamine is biosynthesized by decarboxylation of serine:
 →  + 
Ethanolamine is the second-most-abundant head group for phospholipids, substances found in biological membranes (particularly those of prokaryotes); e.g., phosphatidylethanolamine. It is also used in messenger molecules such as palmitoylethanolamide, which has an effect on CB1 receptors.

Applications
Ethanolamine is commonly called monoethanolamine or MEA in order to be distinguished from diethanolamine (DEA) and triethanolamine (TEA). It is used as feedstock in the production of detergents, emulsifiers, polishes, pharmaceuticals, corrosion inhibitors, and chemical intermediates.

For example, reacting ethanolamine with ammonia gives ethylenediamine, a precursor of the commonly used chelating agent, EDTA.

Gas stream scrubbing

Monoethanolamines can scrub combusted-coal, combusted-methane and combusted-biogas flue emissions of carbon dioxide very efficiently. MEA carbon dioxide scrubbing is also used to regenerate the air on submarines.

Solutions of MEA in water are used as a gas stream scrubbing liquid in amine treaters. For example, aqueous MEA is used to remove carbon dioxide and hydrogen sulfide from various gas streams; e.g., flue gas and sour natural gas. The MEA ionizes dissolved acidic compounds, making them polar and considerably more soluble.

MEA scrubbing solutions can be recycled through a regeneration unit. When heated, MEA, being a rather weak base, will release dissolved  or  gas resulting in a pure MEA solution.

Other uses
In pharmaceutical formulations, MEA is used primarily for buffering or preparation of emulsions. MEA can be used as pH regulator in cosmetics.

It is an injectable sclerosant as a treatment option of symptomatic hemorrhoids. 2–5 ml of ethanolamine oleate can be injected into the mucosa just above the hemorrhoids to cause ulceration and mucosal fixation thus preventing hemorrhoids from descending out of the anal canal.

It is also an ingredient in cleaning fluid for automobile windshields.

pH-control amine
Ethanolamine is often used for alkalinization of water in steam cycles of power plants, including nuclear power plants with pressurized water reactors. This alkalinization is performed to control corrosion of metal components. ETA (or sometimes a similar organic amine; e.g., morpholine) is selected because it does not accumulate in steam generators (boilers) and crevices due to its volatility, but rather distributes relatively uniformly throughout the entire steam cycle. In such application, ETA is a key ingredient of so-called "all-volatile treatment" of water (AVT).

Reactions 
Upon reaction with carbon dioxide, 2 equivalents of ethanolamine react through the intermediacy of carbonic acid to form a carbamate salt, which when heated reforms ethanolamine and carbon dioxide.

References

External links
Process technology to produce ethanolamines by reaction of ammonia and ethylene oxide
CDC - NIOSH Pocket Guide to Chemical Hazards

Primary alcohols
Amines
Commodity chemicals
Ethanolamines